George Randall "Randy" Edmunds (born June 24, 1946) is a former American football linebacker who played professionally in the American Football League (AFL) and the National Football League (NFL). He played for the AFL's Miami Dolphins and the NFL's New England Patriots and Baltimore Colts. He played collegiately for the Georgia Tech football team.

Living people
1946 births
People from Washington, Georgia
Players of American football from Georgia (U.S. state)
American football linebackers
Georgia Tech Yellow Jackets football players
Miami Dolphins players
New England Patriots players
Baltimore Colts players
American Football League players